Henry Thomas Ellett (March 8, 1812 – October 15, 1887) was a lawyer, politician, judge, and U.S. Representative from Mississippi.

Biography
Born in Salem, New Jersey, Ellett attended the Latin School in Salem and Princeton College, where he studied law. He was admitted to the bar in 1833 and commenced practice in Bridgeton, New Jersey. Ellet moved to Port Gibson, Mississippi, in 1837 and continued the practice of law, in which he was successful.

In the 1846 election, the Democrat Ellett defeated future Civil War general Peter B. Starke for a seat in the Twenty-ninth Congress to fill the vacancy caused by the resignation of Jefferson Davis. He served from January 26 to March 3, 1847. He declined to be a candidate for reelection in 1846 and resumed the practice of law.

He served as a member of the Mississippi State Senate 1853–65, a period that included the Civil War. He was one of the three commissioners who framed the code of 1857. He was member of the State secession convention in 1861, and member of the committee that framed and reported the ordinance of secession of Mississippi. He was appointed Postmaster General of the Confederacy in February 1861 but declined.

After the war ended, Ellett was elected judge of the newly reconstituted Mississippi Supreme Court on October 2, 1865, and served until January 1868, when he resigned. He moved to Memphis, Tennessee, in 1868 and resumed the practice of law in a firm formed with William Littleton Harris and James Phelan, Sr. Ellett was elected chancellor of the twelfth division of Tennessee in 1886.

He died while delivering an address of welcome to President Grover Cleveland in Memphis on October 15, 1887. He was interred in Elmwood Cemetery.

References

1812 births
1887 deaths
People from Salem, New Jersey
People from Port Gibson, Mississippi
Princeton University alumni
People of Mississippi in the American Civil War
Democratic Party Mississippi state senators
Mississippi lawyers
Tennessee lawyers
Democratic Party members of the United States House of Representatives from Mississippi
American postmasters
Justices of the Mississippi Supreme Court
Tennessee state court judges
19th-century American politicians
19th-century American judges
19th-century American lawyers